Chris Klein may refer to:
Chris Klein (soccer) (born 1976), American soccer player
Chris Klein (actor) (born 1979), American actor

See also
Chris Cline (1958–2019), American billionaire mining entrepreneur
Chris Kline or Vertexguy (born 1979), American guitarist
Christopher M. Klein, American judge
Christian Kleine (born 1974), German musician
Christina Baker Kline (born 1964), American novelist
Kristin Klein (born 1970), American volleyball player
Chris Klein-Beekman (1971–2003), Canadian aid worker and victim of the Canal Hotel bombing